Dinosaur Swamps is the second album by The Flock. It was released in 1970.

The cover art, featuring pterosaurs, is modified from a mural painted by Constantin Astori.

Track listing
All tracks composed by The Flock
"Green Slice" – 2:02
"Big Bird" – 5:50
"Hornschmeyer's Island" – 7:25
"Lighthouse" – 5:19
"Crabfoot" – 8:14
"Mermaid" - 4:53
"Uranian Sircus" - 7:11

Personnel 
Jerry Goodman - violin, guitars, vocals
Fred Glickstein - guitars, lead vocals, Hammond organ
Jerry Smith - bass guitar, vocals
Ron Karpman - drums
Rick Canoff - tenor saxophone, vocals
Tom Webb   -  tenor saxophone, vocals
Frank Posa - trumpet
John Gerber - alto and tenor saxophones, flute, banjo, vocals

References

External links
The Flock/Dinosaur Swamps - both albums in one

The Flock (band) albums
1970 albums
Jazz fusion albums by American artists
Columbia Records albums